Henicops washpoolensis is a species of centipede in the Henicopidae family. It is endemic to Australia. It was first described in 2005 by Gregory Edgecombe and Lauren Hollington.

Distribution
The species occurs in New South Wales and Queensland. The type locality is the Washpool State Forest in north-eastern New South Wales.

References

 

 
washpoolensis
Centipedes of Australia
Endemic fauna of Australia
Fauna of New South Wales
Fauna of Queensland
Animals described in 2005
Taxa named by Gregory Edgecombe